Edinburgh South West is a Scottish constituency of the House of Commons of the Parliament of the United Kingdom, first used at the 2005 UK general election. It elects one Member of Parliament (MP) by the first past the post system of election. Since 2015, it has been represented by Joanna Cherry of the Scottish National Party.

Constituency profile
Edinburgh South West covers a south western portion of the city around the Lanark Road. It has an urban north east including Gorgie and Slateford, and a suburban centre including Wester Hailes. The southwest part is rural and extends into the Pentland Hills.

The seat is left-leaning and pro-EU, with wealthier residents than the UK average.

Boundaries 

Edinburgh South West is one of five constituencies covering the City of Edinburgh council area. All are entirely within the city council area.

Prior to the 2005 general election, the city area had been covered by six constituencies and, of the six, there was one, Edinburgh East and Musselburgh, which straddled the boundary with the East Lothian council area, to include Musselburgh.

Edinburgh South West is mostly a replacement for the former Edinburgh Pentlands constituency, but excludes some of the east of that constituency. Also, it includes a south western portion of the former Edinburgh Central constituency. The Scottish Parliament uses different boundaries. Edinburgh South West is mostly contained within the Edinburgh Pentlands constituency for elections to the Scottish Parliament, with some parts of the north and east of the seat being located in the constituencies of Edinburgh Central, Edinburgh Southern and Edinburgh Western.

The constituency comprises the following wards of the City of Edinburgh Council which were used in elections to the council at the time of the constituency's first contest in 2005: Balerno, Baberton, Colinton, Craiglockhart, Dalry, Firrhill, Fountainbridge, Moat, Murrayburn, Parkhead, Shandon and Sighthill. As a result of the Local Governance (Scotland) Act 2004, these wards were replaced with new wards in 2007. Current ward boundaries are not aligned with the constituency boundaries.

Members of Parliament

Election results

Elections in the 2010s

Elections in the 2000s

See also 
 Politics of Edinburgh

References
Specific

General

Westminster Parliamentary constituencies in Scotland
South West
Constituencies of the Parliament of the United Kingdom established in 2005